The Iowa Women's Hall of Fame was created to acknowledge the accomplishments of female role models associated with the U.S. state of Iowa, and is an endeavor of the Iowa Commission on the Status of Women  (ICSW).

History
In 1972, the state of Iowa created the ICSW to oversee women's issues, with Cristine Swanson Wilson  as its first chair. Since  the Hall of Fame's beginnings in 1975, four annual nominees are inducted by the ICSW and the Governor of Iowa in a public ceremony. The event is held on  Women's Equality Day, which commemorates the August 26, 1920 ratification of the Nineteenth Amendment to the United States Constitution that gave women the right to vote. The honorees are nominated by the public via online forms available on the ICSW website.  The ICSW also created the annual "Cristine Wilson Medal for Equality and Justice" in 1982. Wilson was inducted into the Hall of Fame in 1989.

The initial inductees were Iowa's first female Secretary of State Ola Babcock Miller, who created the Iowa State Patrol; president and founding member of Iowa Woman Suffrage Association, Amelia Bloomer; president of the National American Woman Suffrage Association, and founder of the League of Women Voters, Carrie Chapman Catt; and Annie Turner Wittenmyer who founded the Women's Christian Temperance Union, formed an aid society to support Union Army soldiers during the Civil War, as well as helped to pass pension legislation for nurses in that same war. Catt was the first inductee.

In the ensuing years, the Hall of Fame ranks were joined by  women from all walks of life.  As of the 2017 inductee ceremonies, there have been 172 women inducted. The list of inductees includes civil rights pioneers, global issues leaders, community volunteer workers, elected officials, artists, the medical profession and a large cornucopia of contributions by the state's women. Two First Ladies of the United States,  Lou Henry Hoover and Mamie Eisenhower were added in 1987 and 1993 respectively. Environmental preservationist Gladys B. Black made the list in 1985. Mycologist Lois Hattery Tiffany was added in 1991 for her career of educating the public about mushrooms. The military is represented by  Women's Army Corps veteran Rosa Cunningham in 1980 and by former United States Army Judge Advocate General officer Phyllis Propp Fowle in 2001. Vietnam War era anti-war activist Peg Mullen was inducted in 1997.  Pulitzer Prize  winner Susan Glaspell was a 1976 inductee. Hualing Nieh Engle, who in 1976 was co-nominated for the Nobel Peace Prize, became a Hall of Fame inductee in 2008. Cattle breeder Mary Garst was added in 1981. Several women farmers are on the list,  and added in 2001 was attorney Phyllis Josephine Hughes who had also been honored by Pope John Paul II for her legal assistance to the farm community.

Inductees

References

External links
Iowa Women's Hall of Fame official site

Women's halls of fame
Lists of American women
Women in Iowa
Halls of fame in Iowa